Lasionycta quadrilunata is a moth of the family Noctuidae. It is found from south-central Alaska down the spine of the Rocky Mountains to Colorado.

It flies over scree tundra and is diurnal.

Adults are on wing from mid-July to early August.

Subspecies
Lasionycta quadrilunata quadrilunata (mountains of Colorado)
Lasionycta quadrilunata yukona (Alaska Range, southwestern Yukon, the Alberta Rocky Mountains, and the Beartooth Plateau in Montana)

External links
A Revision of Lasionycta Aurivillius (Lepidoptera, Noctuidae) for North America and notes on Eurasian species, with descriptions of 17 new species, 6 new subspecies, a new genus, and two new species of Tricholita Grote

Lasionycta
Moths of North America
Moths described in 1874